Joyce Sandra Hayden (September 20, 1931 – March 7, 2009) was a Canadian politician, who represented the electoral district of Whitehorse South Centre in the Yukon Legislative Assembly from 1989 to 1992. She was a member of the Yukon New Democratic Party.

Background
Hayden was born in Glaslyn, Saskatchewan and raised in Birch Lake, Saskatchewan. She married Earle Hayden in 1949, and the couple moved to the Yukon in 1953.

As founding president of the Yukon Status of Women Council, she spearheaded a campaign to institute a public transit system in Whitehorse, securing an $80,000 grant from Transport Canada to set up a community system, the Yukon Women's Minibus Society. She was also active in the Girl Guides of Canada and the YWCA.

She had been legally blind since 1983.

Politics
Hayden was elected to the Yukon Legislative Assembly in the 1989 election, succeeding Roger Kimmerly in the district of Whitehorse South Centre. She served as Minister of Health and Social Services in the final cabinet of Tony Penikett. In that role, she briefly faced controversy when two young offenders who had escaped from a youth detention facility turned themselves in to her office, and she spent some time talking to them over lunch before turning them back over to the police.

She did not run in the 1992 election.

Career after politics
Hayden went on to be active in the Yukon Commission on Unity, Hospice Yukon and Whitehorse Northern Women: Different Lives, Common Threads Circumpolar Women's Conference. She also wrote two books on Yukon history, including Yukon's Women of Power. In 2003, she was a recipient of the Governor General's Award in Commemoration of the Person's Case.

She died in 2009.

References

1931 births
2009 deaths
Yukon New Democratic Party MLAs
Women MLAs in Yukon
Writers from Whitehorse
Politicians from Whitehorse
Canadian women historians
Canadian biographers
Canadian blind people
Blind politicians
Governor General's Award in Commemoration of the Persons Case winners
Canadian politicians with disabilities
Women biographers
20th-century biographers
20th-century Canadian women writers
20th-century Canadian non-fiction writers
20th-century Canadian women politicians
Canadian women non-fiction writers
20th-century Canadian historians